Mathias Fetsch (born 30 September 1988) is a German professional footballer who plays as a striker for Unterhaching.

Career
Fetsch made his professional debut for TSV 1860 Munich in the 2. Bundesliga on 22 March 2009 when he was substituted in the 83rd minute in a game against SpVgg Greuther Fürth.

On 3 June 2010, he left 1860 Munich to sign for Eintracht Braunschweig. After two years in Braunschweig, Fetsch's contract was not extended, and he signed with Kickers Offenbach for the 2012–13 season.

After Offenbach were relegated at the end of the 2012–13 season, he left for FC Augsburg. As he hardly got any playing time in Augsburg, he was loaned out to 2. Bundesliga team Energie Cottbus until the end of the 2013–14 season. For the 2014–15 season, he was loaned out to Dynamo Dresden.

In July 2017, Fetsch joined Hallescher FC from Holstein Kiel on a free transfer, signing a two-year contract.

In September 2020, he returned to Kickers Offenbach in the Regionalliga Südwest after a seven-year absence.

Career statistics

References

External links
 
 

1988 births
Living people
People from Karlsruhe (district)
Sportspeople from Karlsruhe (region)
German footballers
Germany youth international footballers
Association football forwards
Karlsruher SC II players
TSV 1860 Munich players
TSV 1860 Munich II players
Eintracht Braunschweig players
Eintracht Braunschweig II players
Kickers Offenbach players
FC Augsburg players
FC Energie Cottbus players
Dynamo Dresden players
Holstein Kiel players
Hallescher FC players
SpVgg Unterhaching players
Bundesliga players
2. Bundesliga players
3. Liga players
Regionalliga players
Footballers from Baden-Württemberg